The Geochemical Ocean Sections Study (GEOSECS) was a global survey of the three-dimensional distributions of chemical, isotopic, and radiochemical tracers in the ocean. A key objective was to investigate the deep thermohaline circulation of the ocean, using chemical tracers, including radiotracers, to establish the pathways taken by this. 

Expeditions undertaken during GEOSECS took place in the Atlantic Ocean from July 1972 to May 1973, in the Pacific Ocean from August 1973 to June 1974, and in the Indian Ocean from December 1977 to March 1978. 

Measurements included those of physical oceanographic quantities such as temperature, salinity, pressure and density, chemical / biological quantities such as total inorganic carbon, alkalinity, nitrate, phosphate, silicic acid, oxygen and apparent oxygen utilisation (AOU), and radiochemical / isotopic quantities such as carbon-13, carbon-14 and tritium.

See also
 Global Ocean Data Analysis Project (GLODAP)
 Joint Global Ocean Flux Study (JGOFS)
 World Ocean Atlas (WOA)
 World Ocean Circulation Experiment (WOCE)

References

External links
 GEOSECS data, International Research Institute for Climate and Society
 GEOSECS data, Ocean Data View
 Rivers of the Sea: The Story of GEOSECS, 1975 documentary about the study

Biological oceanography
Carbon
Chemical oceanography
Oceanography
Physical oceanography